The official language of Nicaragua is Spanish; however, Nicaraguans on the Caribbean coast speak indigenous languages and also English. The communities located on the Caribbean coast also have access to education in their native languages. Additionally, Nicaragua has four extinct indigenous languages.

Languages

Spanish

Spanish is spoken by 90% of the country's population. In Nicaragua the voseo form is common, just as in other countries in Central and South America such as Argentina, Bolivia, Costa Rica, coastal parts of Colombia, Honduras or Paraguay. Spanish has many different dialects spoken throughout Latin America, Central American Spanish is the dialect spoken in Nicaragua.

Phonetics and phonology

Some characteristics of Nicaraguan phonology include:
 /s/ at the end of a syllable or before a consonant is pronounced [h].
 j (/x/) is a [h].
 There is a clear distinction between /l/ and /r/, compared to Caribbean dialects.
 /s/, /z/ and in some cases /c/ (as in cerrar) are pronounced as [s].

English

English is also spoken among expatriates from the United States and Canada, and widely used by the tourism sector. On the Caribbean coast, due to the African and English heritage, in places like Bluefields, Pearl Lagoon and on the Corn Islands, the English language is spoken in the form of English creole by the majority of the population there, coexisting with indigenous languages.

Indigenous languages

Several indigenous peoples on the Caribbean coast still use their native language, the main languages being Miskito language, Sumo language, and Rama language. Other Indigenous languages spoken include Garifuna.

Miskito
Miskito is a Misumalpan language spoken by the Miskito people in northeastern Nicaragua along the Caribbean coast, especially in the North Caribbean Coast Autonomous Region. The Miskito language is the most widely spoken indigenous language in Nicaragua, this is because the Miskito people also hold the highest population of Indigenous people in the country.

Mayagna
Mayagna (also known as Sumo or Sumu) is a Misumalpan language spoken in Nicaragua by the Mayagna people. There is wide dialectal variation, and sometimes the major dialects may be listed as separate languages.

Rama
Rama is one of the indigenous languages of the Chibchan family spoken by the Rama people on the island of Rama Cay and south of lake Bluefields on the Caribbean Coast of Nicaragua. The Rama language is severely endangered. Their language was described as "dying quickly for lack of use" as early as the 1860s. By 1980, the Rama were noted as having "all but lost their original ethnic language", and had become speakers of a form of English creole instead, Rama Cay Creole which is spoken by 8,000–9,000 people.

Language revival efforts began in 1980–1981 under the Sandinistas however, they were not successful. The fieldwork for the first dictionary of Rama was done during this time by Robin Schneider, a graduate student from the University of Berlin. In 1992, only approximately 36 fluent speakers could be found among an ethnic population of 649 individuals in 1992, of whom only a few scattered individuals live outside Nicaragua. The number of speakers on Rama Cay island was only 4 in 1992, due to language shift to English that engendered Rama Cay Creole.

Nicaraguan Sign Language
Nicaraguan Sign Language has been of particular interest to linguists as one of the few languages whose birth was recorded.

Minority languages
Nicaragua has many minority groups. Many ethnic groups in Nicaragua, such as the Chinese Nicaraguans and Palestinian Nicaraguans, have maintained their ancestral languages while also speaking Spanish and/or English. Minority languages include Chinese, Arabic, German, Italian among others.

Extinct languages
Nicaragua has a total of 4 extinct languages:

Nahuat
Nahuat, also known as Pipil-Nicarao, is a  dialect of the Nahuatl language, belonging to the Uto-Aztecan language family. This language was spoken by the Pipil-Nicarao people, also referred to simply as the Nicaraos. Nahuat became the lingua franca during the 16th century. A hybrid form of Nahuat-Spanish was spoken by many Nicaraguans up until the 19th century.

Mangue
The Mangue language, also known as Chorotega, consisted of several dialects spoken in western Nicaragua by Chorotega natives. Mangue is a language closely related to the Chiapanec language spoken in Mexico, and is classified as belonging to the Oto-Manguean language family. In the Monimbó neighborhood of the city of Masaya, there are many Chorotega natives but the language that they speak is Spanish.

Subtiaba
The Subtiaba language was an Oto-Manguean language which was spoken on the Pacific slope of Nicaragua by the indigenous Subtiaba people (also sometimes referred to as Maribios, Hokan Xiu, or Xiu-Subtiabas). In 1925, Edward Sapir wrote an article based on scant evidence arguing for the inclusion of Subtiaba in his hypothesized Hokan languages group. Others have linked Subtiaba to the Jicaque and Tol languages of Honduras, but it is generally accepted that Subtiaba is an Oto-Manguean language that shares a close affinity with the Tlapanec language of Mexico. When Sapir wrote about Subtiaba in 1925, it was already very endangered or moribund.

Matagalpa
The Matagalpa language was a Misumalpan language spoken by the indigenous Matagalpa people. In 1981, the population of the Matagalpa people was estimated at 18,000–20,000. The Matagalpa people live in the Central highlands of Nicaragua in the departments of Matagalpa and Jinotega. Matagalpa became extinct in the 19th century; the eponymous people now speak Spanish. Only a few short word lists remain. It was closely related to the Cacaopera language.

See also

Deafness in Nicaragua
Demographics of Nicaragua

References

External links
Explore Nicaragua Languages
History of the Matagalpa language and people (es icon)